Alberto Cortez (born José Alberto García Gallo; 11 March 1940 – 4 April 2019) was an Argentine singer and songwriter. Cortez and his wife Renée Govaerts lived in Madrid.

Career
Cortez was born at 8:00 AM (11:00 GMT) on Monday, 11 March 1940, in Rancul, La Pampa Province, Argentina. He began elementary school at the Alberto Williams conservatory at the age of six. He began composing songs at twelve, including "Un cigarrillo, la lluvia y tú". Later he entered Manuel Ignacio Molina de San Rafael Junior High School in Mendoza province. There he continued his studies of music at the Chopin of San Rafael conservatory.

At seventeen, Cortez became the singer of the Arizona orchestra, where he was known as Chiquito García. At eighteen, he went to study in the Social Sciences and Law School of Buenos Aires and sang in bars to help himself with his studies. Later Cortez began to sing in the orchestra of Mario Cardi and was contracted to sing in the San Francisco jazz orchestra. He traveled all over the country with them and began to use his pseudonym "Alberto Cortez" while singing with the orchestra of Armando Pointier. Cortez dropped out of school and dedicated himself fully to music.

Aged twenty, Cortez travelled to Antwerp, Belgium where he recorded his first album. His record "Sucu Sucu" reached number one. Cortez met Renee Govaerts and later married her. After a difficult start he consolidated himself as one of the most renowned composer-singers of Latin America with hits like "Mi árbol y yo", "Mariana", "Como el primer día", "A partir de mañana" and "Callejero".

He died as a result of a gastric hemorrhage at 3:30 PM (13:30 GMT) on Thursday, 4 April 2019, in the city of Móstoles, in the Community of Madrid, Spain, at 79 years of age.

See also
 List of singer-songwriters
 List of composers

References

External links
 Official Site
 Songs and Bibliography
 Brief biography and some lyrics (English)

1940 births
2019 deaths
People from La Pampa Province
Grammy Award winners
20th-century Argentine male singers
Argentine male singer-songwriters
Argentine emigrants to Spain
Latin Grammy Lifetime Achievement Award winners
Latin music songwriters
Argentine people of Galician descent
Deaths from gastrointestinal hemorrhage